Henri Grégoire Saivet (born 26 October 1990) is a Senegalese professional footballer who plays as a midfielder for French  club Pau and the Senegal national team. He is a former France youth international.

Saivet began his career with Bordeaux, making his debut aged 17, and spending nine years at the club before being signed by English club Newcastle United. He made few appearances for Newcastle and was loaned out to Saint-Étienne, and Turkish clubs Sivasspor and Bursaspor before leaving in 2021. After a year without a club, he signed for Pau.

Club career

Bordeaux
In 2007, Saivet signed his first professional contract with Bordeaux, thus making him the youngest professional player in the history of the club. He subsequently made his professional debut during the 2007–08 season, at the age of 17, in a league match against Lens. Saivet scored a goal in the final of the 2013 Coupe de France to help Bordeaux defeat Evian 3–2.

Newcastle United
On 11 January 2016, Bordeaux manager Willy Sagnol confirmed that he gave Saivet permission to leave the club. Later that day Saivet officially signed a five-and-half year contract with Newcastle United, joining for a reported fee of £5 million.

After playing just four matches starting twice in half a season with Newcastle United, Saivet joined Saint-Étienne on a season-long loan on 23 August 2016 without a purchase option given to Saint-Étienne.

On 23 August 2017, Saivet played his first game for Newcastle since 6 February 2016, starting an EFL Cup tie against Nottingham Forest. He was recalled to the first team on 23 December and scored a free kick in a 3–2 Premier League win against West Ham.

On 25 August 2018, it was announced that Saivet would join Turkish club Bursaspor on loan for the season.

Pau
In June 2022, Saivet joined French club Pau.

International career
He made his debut for Senegal on 14 August 2013.

Career statistics

Club

International

International goals
Scores and results list Senegal's goal tally first.

Honours
Bordeaux
Coupe de la Ligue: 2008–09
Coupe de France: 2012–13

Senegal
 Africa Cup of Nations runner-up: 2019

References

External links

 

1990 births
Living people
Footballers from Dakar
French footballers
France youth international footballers
France under-21 international footballers
Senegalese footballers
Senegal international footballers
Association football midfielders
FC Girondins de Bordeaux players
Angers SCO players
Newcastle United F.C. players
AS Saint-Étienne players
Sivasspor footballers
Bursaspor footballers
Pau FC players
Championnat National 2 players
Ligue 1 players
Ligue 2 players
Premier League players
Süper Lig players
2015 Africa Cup of Nations players
2017 Africa Cup of Nations players
2019 Africa Cup of Nations players
French expatriate footballers
Senegalese expatriate footballers
Expatriate footballers in England
Expatriate footballers in Turkey
French expatriate sportspeople in England
French expatriate sportspeople in Turkey
Senegalese expatriate sportspeople in England
Senegalese expatriate sportspeople in Turkey
French sportspeople of Senegalese descent
Senegalese emigrants to France
Naturalized citizens of France
Footballers from Bordeaux